Eugène Verconsin (19 May 1823 - 28 December 1891) was a French playwright, author of twenty something comedies and vaudevilles.

Plays 
1850 : Les Roués innocents, 1-act comedy mixed with songs by Lefranc and Verconsin, performed in Paris, Théâtre Montansier, 16 August 
1857 : Télémaque, ou l'Innocence en danger sauvée par l'intrépide résolution d'un vieillard qui ne craignait pas l'eau froide, Greek burlesque tragedy at the time of the Trojan War, by Eugène Verconsin. Premiered on 30 April 1857 at Paris
1861 : Une dette de jeunesse, comedy in 1 act, in prose, by Eugène Verconsin and Eugène Lesbazeilles, Paris, Théâtre du Gymnase, 10 October
1863 : C'était Gertrude ! 1-act comedy-vaudeville, by M. Eugène Verconsin. Paris, played on 28 June 1863
1864 : En wagon épisode de Voyage, vaudeville in one act
1864 : Les Erreurs de Jean, comédie-vaudeville in 1 act, played in Paris, on 31 October 1864
1869 : Saynètes Et Comédies 
1869 : Les Rêves de Marguerite, 1-act comedy 
1870 : La matrone d'Éphèse: 1-act comedy
1870 : Les Curiosités de Jeanne, comedy-vaudeville in 1 act performed in Paris, on 24 January 1870
1870 : Adélaïde et Vermouth, military romance and vaudeville in one act 
1875 : À La Porte, 1-act comedy 
1875 : Quête à domicile, 1-act comedy 
1875 : Ici, Médor ! 1-act comedy played in Paris, at the théâtre du Palais-Royal on 3 July 1875
1876 : La Crise de M. Thomassin, comedy in 3 acts, played in Paris, at the théâtre du Gymnase, on 31 July 1876 
1878 : Théâtre de campagne by Eugène Verconsin and André Theuriet  
1880 : Théâtre des familles, by Gustave Nadaud, Maurice Ordonneau and Eugène Verconsin 
1884 : L'Une, ou l'autre ?, saynète in 1 act
1885 : La Folle du logis, monologue
1886 : La Sortie de Saint-Cyr, comedy in 1 act, played in Paris, at the Théâtre-Français, on 22 June 1886
1890 : Fais Ce Que Dois comedy
undated : Les Trois souhaits, comedy

In 1888, Eugène Verconsin foreworded a book by the author Aylic Marin, pen name of Édouard Petit who had written: En Océanie, published by éditions Charles Bayle, in the Petite bibliotheque populaire collection.

External links 
Ouvrages d'Eugène Verconsin
Patronyme et liste électorale

19th-century French dramatists and playwrights
Writers from Paris
1823 births
1891 deaths